Goedert is a surname. Notable people with the surname include:

 Dallas Goedert (born 1995), American football player
 Johny Goedert (born 1929), Luxembourgish racing cyclist
 Michel Goedert, Luxembourgish-British neuroscientist
 Raymond E. Goedert (born 1927), American Roman Catholic titular bishop of Tamazeni

Surnames from given names